Boris Bonov (20 October 1900 – 22 December 1972) was a Bulgarian footballer. He competed in the men's tournament at the 1924 Summer Olympics.

References

1900 births
1972 deaths
Bulgarian footballers
Bulgaria international footballers
Olympic footballers of Bulgaria
Footballers at the 1924 Summer Olympics
Place of birth missing
Association football defenders